Skara Municipality (Skara kommun) is a municipality in Västra Götaland County in western Sweden. Its seat is located in the city of Skara.

The area of the municipality consists of 16 original local government entities. The municipal reform of 1952 grouped them into four new entities. In 1971 the City of Skara was amalgamated with the rural municipalities to form the present unit.

Localities
Ardala, pop. 745
Axvall, pop 1 164
Eggby, pop. 237
Skara (seat), pop. 11 437
Varnhem, pop. 662

Varnhem is renowned for its medieval monastery.

See also
Skaraborg County
Diocese of Skara

References

External links

Skara Municipality - Official site

Municipalities of Västra Götaland County
Skaraborg